Agnieszka Kocela (born 17 January 1988) is a Polish handball player for SPR Lublin SSA and the Polish national team.

References

1987 births
Living people
Polish female handball players
People from Jelenia Góra
Sportspeople from Lower Silesian Voivodeship
21st-century Polish women